Big Fun is the third album by American R&B group Shalamar, released in 1979 on the SOLAR label. The album features the group's most successful hit on the Hot 100 pop chart, "The Second Time Around".

Big Fun has been certified Gold in the United States for sales of over 500,000.  It peaked at #4 on the R&B chart and #23 on the Billboard chart (Shalamar's highest-placing album on this chart).  In the UK it reached #45.

In 2002, Big Fun was re-released by Sanctuary Records in the United Kingdom in a two-for-one CD format with Shalamar's following album Three for Love.

The song "I Owe You One" was sampled in Raw Man's "Beautiful", and Le Knight Club's "Mosquito".

Reception
Allmusic rated the album four out of five stars. Writer Colin Larkin rated it three out of five.

The album sold 625,000+ units as of July 1982. Its single "The Second Time Around" sold around 1.8 million units.

Track listing

Personnel

Shalamar
Jody Watley, Jeffrey Daniel, Howard Hewett: lead and backing vocals

Musical Personnel
Kevin Spencer: keyboards, clavinet
William Shelby: keyboards, clavinet, Fender Rhodes
Kossi Gardner: keyboards, Fender Rhodes, Hammond organ
"Gip" Nobels, Gene Dozier, Joey Gallo, John Barnes, Ron Artists: keyboards 
Ernest Biles, James Davis: bass
Leon Sylvers III: bass, percussion
Ernest Reed, Fred Rheimert, Steve Shockley: guitars
Freeman Brown, Gerald Thompson, Wardell Potts: drums
Greg "Popeye" Dawkins: congas
Fred Lewis: percussion
Christine Ermacoff, Edgar Lustgarten, Harry Shlutz, Marie Fera: cellos
Brian Leanord, David Johnson, Jerry Vinci, Ilkka Talvi, Irma Newman, Norman Carr, Norman Leonard, Reginald Hill, Ronald Fulsom, Sheldon Sanou: violins

Charts

Weekly charts

Year-end charts

Single

References

External links
 Shalamar-Big Fun at Discogs

Shalamar albums
1979 albums
SOLAR Records albums
Albums produced by Leon Sylvers III